Bembridge is a surname. Notable people with the surname include:

 Brian Sidney Bembridge (born 1973), American scenic, lighting, and costume designer 
 Garett Bembridge (born 1981), Canadian ice hockey player
 Henry Bembridge (1852–?), English cricketer
 Maurice Bembridge (born 1945), English golfer